The NCR 304 computer hardware, announced in 1957, first delivered in 1959, was National Cash Register (NCR)'s first transistor-based computer. The 304 was developed and manufactured in cooperation with General Electric, where it was also used internally. 

Its follow-on was the NCR 315.

See also

 Computer architecture
 Electronic hardware
 Glossary of computer hardware terms
 History of computing hardware
 List of computer hardware manufacturers
 Open-source computing hardware
 Open-source hardware
 Transistor

References

Transistorized computers
NCR Corporation products
Decimal computers